Passenger is a 2009 Indian Malayalam-language conspiracy thriller film written and directed by debutant Ranjith Sankar and starring Sreenivasan, Dileep, Mamta Mohandas, Jagathy Sreekumar and Nedumudi Venu in major roles. It was a path breaker in Malayalam cinema in terms of its story telling and started the Malayalam new cinema wave. Owing to its critical and commercial success, Passenger was to be remade into Tamil as Muriyadi by Selva.

Plot
Passenger is based on two characters, who have never had anything to do with each other, and the impact they cause on each other's lives. The movie shows the events that follow.

Sathyanathan, who works in a private company, is a simple man who lives an orderly and uncomplicated life. He travels from his native town to Kochi (where he works) by train. The moment the train crosses the Chalakudy bridge he dozes off and wakes up at another station. All this happens with utmost precision, as if programmed by someone. He is someone who fights for social justices for the benefit of everyone and shirks from any publicity gained by it.

Nandhan Menon, who is an advocate, stands for truth and justice. He respects the law and always thinks of the welfare of the people around him. His wife Anuradha is a bold reporter who works for private news channel Right TV.

Maranchara is a small coastal village. A private company has been awarded rights to mine nuclear fuel from the coast in Maranchara by Home Minister Thomas Chacko. There is a political sex scandal and a legal battle within which Minister Chacko, Nandhan Menon, Anuradha Nandan and Thankamma (a local leader) are involved. The plot takes a turn when Anuradha obtains a video clip of the minister collaborating with police and corporates. They plan to kill innocent people who are occupying land with potential mineral resources. Nandhan is kidnapped by gangsters working for the minister to lure Anuradha into returning the video.

By sheer coincidence, Sathyanathan gets involved. Unlike normal bystanders, he and Driver Nair decide to join the couple in the fight to save the people of Maranchara, Nandhan Menon and Anuradha. They team up and decide to show the video clip to the Chairman of Right TV, where Anuradha is working. When it is telecasted via their channel, all the play and decision of Minister fails and he is dismissed. Nandhan sends an SMS to Anuradha where he is held hostage. But Anuradha has already gone to her office with her co-workers, sent by the chairman. Sathyanathan gets the SMS sent to Anuradha's phone (she forgets the phone in backseat of taxi). As informed by Nandhan in SMS, driver drops Sathyanathan to Aluva railway station and the driver leaves without charging him. Sathyanathan catches the passenger train and reaches the location, pulls the chain and gets down and seen Nandhan and takes him to the hospital. With no other word said or heard, he leaves the hospital. Later that night, he reaches home and switches on the TV in which he see the interview with Mr. and Mrs Nandhan Menon thanking him, the person unknown to them. The next morning, Sathyanathan resumes with his daily life.

Cast

 Sreenivasan as Sathyanathan
 Dileep as Advocate Nandhan Menon                                  
 Mamta Mohandas as Anuradha Nandhan
 Jagathy Sreekumar as Home Minister Thomas Chacko
 Nedumudi Venu as Driver Nair
 Lakshmi Sharma as Gayathri
 Madhu as Right TV Chairman
 Harisree Ashokan as Varghese, Sathyanathan's friend
 Manikuttan as Sudheendran
 Anandsami as Anali Shaji
 Sreejith Ravi as Sunny
 Anoop Chandran as Unni, Sathyanathan's friend
 Kochu Preman as Jaffer, Sathyanathan's friend
 T. P. Madhavan as Thankappan, Sathyanathan's friend
 Sona Nair as Thankamma Rajan
 Shivaji Guruvayoor as Station Master
 Manikandan Pattambi as Minister's assistant
 Anandkumar as Alex Koshy
 Valsala Menon as Sathyanathan's mother
 Lipoy as D.G.P.
 Saju. V. J. as Circle Inspector
 Jobi Moothedathu as Sivan
 Pala Aravindan as M.D.
 Sibi Kuruvila as Sajan
 Master Vineet Vinayaka as Sathyanathan's son
 Nilambur Ayisha as Nasibu Umma
 Shandy as Journalist
 Revathy as Sathyanathan's daughter
 Krishna Praba as receptionist

Awards

 Lohithadas Puraskaram for Best Screenplay
The film won the first Lohithadas Puraskaram for Best Screenplay, an award to commemorize screenwriter A.K. Lohithadas.

Dubai AMMA Awards
 Best Socially Committed movie
 Best Debut director - Ranjith Sankar
 Best Villain - Jagathy Sreekumar

Asianet Film Awards
 Best Character Actor - Sreenivasan
 Best screenplay - Ranjith Sankar

Kerala Film Critics Award
 Best Popular movie
 Special Jury Award for direction - Ranjith Sankar

Vanitha Nippon Awards
 Best Villain - Jagathy Sreekumar

Mathrubhumi Amritha Awards
 Most Popular actor - Sreenivasan

World Malayali Council - Kairali Awards
 Best Screenplay - Ranjith Sankar

Surya TV Awards
 Best Debut director - Ranjith Sankar
 Best Villain - Jagathy Sreekumar

V. Santharam Awards
 Best Debut director (Nomination)

Filmfare Awards
 Best Director (Nomination)
 Best Actress (Nomination)

Jaihind Awards
Best Villain - Jagathy Sreekumar

SouthScope Awards
 Best Director (Nomination)
 Best Actress (Nomination)

Soundtrack

The soundtrack of Passenger, features one song which is the theme song of the movie, is composed by Bijibal and sung by Vineeth Sreenivasan

Box office
The film was superhit at box-office.

References

External links
 

2000s Malayalam-language films
2009 films
2000s thriller films
Indian thriller films
Films set in Kerala
Films shot in Chalakudy
Films shot in Thrissur
Films shot in Kochi
Films directed by Ranjith Sankar